Jan Zwartendijk (29 July 1896 – 14 September 1976) was a Dutch businessman and diplomat. As director of the Philips factories in Lithuania and part-time acting consul of the Dutch government-in-exile, he supervised the writing of 2,345 visas for Curaçao to save Jews from the Holocaust during World War II. In 1997, Yad Vashem recognised him as Righteous Among the Nations.

Early life
Zwartendijk was born in Rotterdam.

World War II

In 1939, he was named director of the Lithuanian branch of production of Philips.

When the Soviet Union took over Lithuania in 1940, some Jewish Dutch residents in Lithuania approached Zwartendijk to get a visa to the Dutch Indies. With Zwartendijk's superior, Ambassador to Latvia L. P. J. de Decker's permission, he agreed to help them. The word spread and Jews who had fled from German-occupied Poland also sought his assistance.

Ambassador De Dekker had been encouraged by a Jewish applicant to write a declaration on her visa stating that entering Curaçao and Dependencies in the West Indies did not require a visa, while omitting the part about the permission of the Governor of Curaçao being required. Told of this, Zwartendijk followed suit and in a few days, with the help of aides, produced over 2,000 visas for Jews to Curaçao.

Refugees also approached Chiune Sugihara, a Japanese consul, who gave them a transit visa through Japan, against the disapproval of his government. This gave many refugees an opportunity to leave Lithuania for the Far East via the Trans-Siberian railway.

In the three weeks after 16 July 1940, Zwartendijk wrote 2,345 de facto visas to Curaçao and some of the Jews copied more. Many who helped only knew him as "Mr Philips Radio". When the Soviet Union annexed Lithuania, they closed down his Philips office and the embassies and consulates in Kaunas on 3 August 1940. He returned to the occupied Netherlands to work in the Philips headquarters in Eindhoven until his retirement, and did not talk about the matter. Zwartendijk died in Eindhoven in 1976.

Awards
In 1996, Boys Town Jerusalem, an orphanage and vocational training school in Jerusalem, honoured Zwartendijk at a tribute dinner in New York City and announced the establishment of the Jan Zwartendijk Award for Humanitarian Ethics and Values. The award has since been bestowed on other Holocaust-era saviors, including President Manuel Luis Quezon and the people of the Republic of the Philippines.

In 1997, Yad Vashem bestowed the title Righteous Among the Nations on Zwartendijk. In June 2018, a monument to Zwartendijk (about 2,000 LED rods connected into a  diameter spiral) was unveiled on Laisvės alėja, Kaunas by King Willem-Alexander of the Netherlands and President Dalia Grybauskaitė.

Popular culture
In 2018 Dutch author Jan Brokken published "De Rechtvaardigen" (The Just), a book describing the rescue operation and Zwartendijk's life. The title refers to all diplomats involved in the rescue operation.

In the novel The Amazing Adventures of Kavalier & Clay by Michael Chabon, it is implied that the protagonist Josef Kavalier receives visas from Zwartendijk and his ally Chiune Sugihara. Though the novel does not mention these men by name, it describes a "Dutch consul in Kovno who was madly issuing visas to Curaçao, in league with a Japanese official who would grant rights of transit" (p. 65).

Zwartendijk is also portrayed in the Japanese biopic of Sugihara, Persona Non Grata.

References

External links
 Zwartendijk in Remember.org
 Zwartendijk in the Jewish Virtual Library
 Zwartendijk in Holocaust Encyclopedia
 Zwartendijk in Isurvived.org
 Zwartendijk in Raoul Wallenberg Foundation

1896 births
1976 deaths
Businesspeople from Rotterdam
20th-century Dutch diplomats
Dutch corporate directors
Dutch Righteous Among the Nations
The Holocaust in Lithuania
People who rescued Jews during the Holocaust
20th-century Dutch businesspeople